Iurie Miterev (28 February 1975 – 27 June 2012) was a Moldovan footballer.

Club career
Miterev came to fame when he became runner-up in the top goalscoring chart of the Moldovan league in 1996–97 with 34 goals, only one behind Serghei Rogaciov. The next season, he came second again, this time behind Serghei Cleşcenco.

He was signed by Chornomorets Odessa in the summer of 2002.

International career
Miterev won 36 caps for the Moldova national football team. He played five games in 2006 FIFA World Cup qualification (UEFA).

Career statistics

International goals

Other Fact

Iurie Miterev was one of the 11 Moldovan football players challenged and beaten by Tony Hawks and features in his book Playing the Moldovans at Tennis.

Death
On 27 June 2012, Iurie Miterev died of leukemia.

References

External links
 
 FIFA.com
 Profile at FFU website 
 PublikaTV

1975 births
2012 deaths
Moldovan footballers
Moldova international footballers
Moldovan expatriate footballers
FC Zimbru Chișinău players
Moldovan Super Liga players
FC Chornomorets Odesa players
FC Zorya Luhansk players
Ukrainian Premier League players
Expatriate footballers in Russia
Expatriate footballers in Ukraine
Moldovan expatriate sportspeople in Ukraine
Deaths from leukemia
Association football forwards
FC Mashuk-KMV Pyatigorsk players